Shelburne and Queen's was a federal electoral district in the province of Nova Scotia, Canada, that was represented in the House of Commons of Canada from 1896 to 1925.

This riding was created in 1892 from parts of Queens and Shelburne ridings. It consisted of the counties of Queen's and Shelburne. It was abolished in 1924 when it was redistributed into Queens—Lunenburg and Shelburne—Yarmouth ridings.

Members of Parliament

This riding elected the following Members of Parliament:

Election results

By-election: On Mr. Forbes' being appointed Sub-Collector of Customs, 18 July 1896

By-election: On Mr. Fielding's election being declared void, 8 October 1906

By-election: On Mr. Fielding's acceptance of an office of emolument under the Crown, 29 December 1921

See also 

 List of Canadian federal electoral districts
 Past Canadian electoral districts

External links 
 Riding history for Shelburne and Queen's (1892–1924) from the Library of Parliament

Former federal electoral districts of Nova Scotia